Lola (also known as Lola and the Sea) is a 2019 Belgian-French drama film written and directed by Laurent Micheli. It stars Mya Bollaers, in her acting debut, as a 18-year-old transgender girl grieving the death of her mother. The film had its world premiere at the 2019 Angoulême Film Festival.

At the 10th Magritte Awards, Lola received seven nominations, including Best Film and Best Director for Laurent Micheli, winning Most Promising Actress for Mya Bollaers and Best Production Design for Catherine Cosme. Bollaers became the first openly transgender person to be nominated for the award.

Cast
 Mya Bollaers as Lola
 Benoît Magimel as Philippe
 Els Deceukelier as the club's owner
 Sami Outalbali as Samir

Critical reception
On review aggregator website AlloCiné, the film has a weighted average score of 72 out of 100, based on 20 critics.

Accolades

References

External links
 
 

2019 films
2019 drama films
Belgian drama films
Belgian LGBT-related films
French drama films
French LGBT-related films
2010s French-language films
2010s Dutch-language films
Transgender-related films
2019 LGBT-related films
2019 multilingual films
Belgian multilingual films
Dutch multilingual films
2010s French films